Wijk bij Duurstede is a municipality and a city in the central Netherlands.

Population centres 
Cothen
Langbroek
Wijk bij Duurstede

Topography

Dutch Topographic map of the municipality of Wijk bij Duurstede, 2013.

City 
The city (population as of 2007: 23,377) is located on the Rhine. At Wijk bij Duurstede, the Kromme Rijn (Crooked Rhine) branches off, and the main branch is called Lek River downstream from Wijk bij Duurstede.

The name 'Wijk bij Duurstede' means 'Neighbourhood by Duurstede'. Duurstede is the name of the nearby castle/ruin, also called Dorestad, where the bishop of Utrecht used to live. Wijk bij Duurstede is the former location of Dorestad, an important Frisian trade settlement during Carolingian times that was pillaged around 850 by the Vikings.

Wijk bij Duurstede has the only drive-through wind mill in the world. The mill is often confused with the mill that was made famous by Ruisdael's 1670 painting The windmill at Wijk bij Duurstede, but that mill no longer exists (its foundations can still be seen a couple of blocks away from the remaining mill). At the market place of Wijk bij Duurstede is one of the few church towers in the Netherlands with a flat roof, as built because the bishop could not afford to build a spire. Inside the tower a picture displays the planned construction of the tower. The tower was supposed to become higher than the Domtoren in Utrecht.

Wijk bij Duurstede received city rights in 1300.

Notable people 
 Rorik of Dorestad (ca.810– ca.880) Danish Viking who ruled over parts of Frisia 841-873
 Dirck van Baburen (ca.1595–1624) painter of the Utrecht School 
 Thomas van Rhee (1634–1701) colonial administrator, 13th Governor of Dutch Ceylon
 Dirk Fock (1858–1941) politician and diplomat, Governor-General of the Dutch East Indies 1921–1926 
 Gerrit Achterberg (1905–1962) poet
 Everhardus Jacobus Ariëns (1918–2002) pharmacologist and academic
 Johannes Alphonsus Huisman (1919-2003), philologist
 Dick Kooijman  (born 1972) footballer with 322 club caps

Gallery

References

External links

Official website

 
Municipalities of Utrecht (province)
Populated places in Utrecht (province)